The Birmingham Small Heath by-election was held on 27 November 1952.  It was held due to the death of the incumbent Labour MP, Fred Longden.  It was won by the Labour candidate William Wheeldon.

References

Small Heath, 1952
Birmingham Small Heath by-election
Birmingham Small Heath by-election
Birmingham Small Heath by-election, 1952
Birmingham Small Heath by-election